Strict sustainability standards for biofuel in the European Union (EU) are set by the European Commissioner on Energy. Biofuels are considered a renewable alternative to fossil fuels in the transportation sector for the EU. The EU has played a large role in increasing the use of biofuels in member states; however, it has also aimed, to some extent, to mitigate the potential negative impacts of biofuel production. Current EU legislation on biofuels includes a goal to increase renewable energy consumption by 20%, eliminate biofuel feedstock sourced from carbon-rich land, accounting for emissions caused from land use change as well as solely biofuel usage, and reducing greenhouse gas intensities from fuels used in transport and machinery.

Background 
The European Union (EU) has its own subsidiary body that handles all energy-related issues, called the European Commission on Energy. They define biofuels as "liquid or gaseous transport fuels such as biodiesel and bioethanol which are made from biomass". Chemically, biofuels are alcohols produced by fermenting raw materials from starch and sugars. One of the more prominent biofuels, ethanol, is made up of biomass such as sugarcane and corn. Other sources of biofuel such as biomethane and biofertilizers are produced from unusable straw. The use of these products increases the energy yield per hectare of agricultural land by as much as 50%. Compared to petroleum, this process leads to up to an 80% reduction in carbon dioxide production. Ethanol fuels can be used as a fuel substitute or as an additive in vehicles using combustion engines. If these fuels are used for electricity or heating, they are considered bioliquids. According to the European Commission on Energy, biofuels "emit less CO2, contain no sulphur compounds, and are generally more efficient due to their higher energy density". The goals of the EU are to reduce greenhouse gas emissions and reduce their dependency on other nations for fossil fuels. For this resource to be considered renewable, the EU has strict sustainability standards for the production of and use of biofuels. The three main criteria for biofuels to be sustainable and allowed for use are:

 Biofuels must achieve greenhouse gas savings of at least 35% versus fossil fuels, which then rises to 50% in 2017, then rises again to 60% in 2018. The rising standards are only for new production plants. (The entire life cycle emissions of the fuel are taken into account in these savings which includes cultivation, processing, and transport.)
 Biofuels must not be grown in areas that are currently, or were previously, carbon sinks (e.g. wetlands, forests).
 Raw materials obtained from areas with high biodiversity, such as forests or grasslands, cannot be used to produce biofuels.

To ensure these standards are met by the companies that produce and cultivate biofuels, there are several ways that the EU may verify their compliance. One method is that these companies must participate in voluntary schemes. A scheme is an independent and external group or company that will verify whether a company is following the sustainability criteria for biofuels. The schemes are usually privately run but must be recognized as valid by the European Commission.

The following is a list of approved voluntary schemes:

 ISCC (International Sustainability and Carbon Certification)
 Bonsucro EU
 RTRS EU RED (Round Table on Responsible Soy EU RED)
 RSB EU RED (Roundtable of Sustainable Biofuels EU RED)
 2BSvs (Biomass Biofuels voluntary scheme)
Red Tractor (Red Tractor farm Assurance Combinable Crops & Sugar Beet Scheme)
 SQC (Scottish Quality Farm Assured Combinable Crops scheme)
 Red Cert
 HVO Renewable Diesel Scheme for Verification of Compliance with the RED sustainability criteria for biofuels
 Gafta Trade Assurance Scheme
 KZR INIG System
 Trade Assurance Scheme for Combinable Crops
 Universal Feed Assurance Scheme

Biofuel statistics in the European Union

European Advanced Biofuels Flightpath 
The European Commission on Energy has established criteria on the use of biofuels for aviation in the EU. Emissions from the aviation sector of transportation account for 3% of total emissions in the EU. They introduced the "European Advanced Biofuels Flightpath" in 2011, which promotes the increased use of biofuels in the aviation industry. They have also partnered with several airlines (Lufthansa, Air France/KLM, and British Airways) and biofuel producers (Choren Industries, Neste Oils, Biomass Technology Group, and UOP) to achieve the goals set in the Flightpath. The European Advanced Biofuels Flightpath aims to get biofuels to the market faster through the production of more advanced production facilities and to have the aviation industry use 2 million tonnes of biofuels by 2020. The Flightpath also outlines how the commission will achieve its financial goals.. As a part of the Flightpath, the EU also plans to facilitate purchase agreements between aviation companies and biofuel producers.

Rules have been established by the commission to address a problem associated with thepotential indirect land use change that biofuel production may cause, since biofuel production usually takes place on former cropland. Since those crops will still be needed, it is possible that destroying forests or other natural areas may be necessary in order to increase agricultural land, which could potentially negate all emission reductions from the production of biofuels. The EU Commission on Energy introduced several new rules to address indirect land use change in 2015, in the form of amendments on the Renewable Energy Directive and Fuel Quality Directive (Directive 2009/30/EC). These amendments include:

 limiting the share of biofuels from crops grown on agricultural land that can be counted towards the 2020 renewable energy targets to 7%.
 setting an indicative 0.5% target for advanced biofuels as a reference for national targets which will be set by EU countries in 2017.
 harmonising the list of feedstocks for biofuels across the EU whose contribution would count double towards the 2020 target of 10% for renewable energy in transport.
 requiring that biofuels produced in new installations emit at least 60% fewer greenhouse gases than fossil fuels.
 introducing stronger incentives for the use of renewable electricity in transport (by counting it more toward the 2020 target of 10% for renewable energy use in transport).
 enhancing reporting obligations for the fuel providers, EU countries and the European Commission.

History 
Germany ranks first in biofuel use in the EU, partly due to the early implementation of such fuel sources. Nicolaus August Otto, a German engineer, was one of the first pioneers in biofuel use. His early prototypes of combustion engines ran on ethanol in the 1860s. Additionally, German inventor and mechanical engineer Rudolf Diesel designed his original diesel engine to run on peanut oil.  However, due to the discovery of large supplies of oil in the United States, petroleum prices plummeted and the use of biofuels dropped because of the relative ease and cheaper cost of petroleum fuels. As the oil industry continued to grow, the start of World War II forced Germany to continue research into alternatives for imported fuel due to strained international relations. With the increased pressure for alternative fuel sources, German inventors implemented the use of gasoline along with alcohol derived from potatoes.

During this same period, the United Kingdom, who now ranks fifth in European biofuel use, also explored alternative fuel use as fuel was crucial for the war, becoming the second country to discover the concept of mixing grain alcohol with petrol. However, with the end of the war, interest in biofuels waned. A combination of cheap oil from the Persian Gulf and the Middle East and increased geopolitical peace would lead to fewer advancements in alternative fuel sources.

Between 1973 and 1979 a fuel crisis driven by geopolitical conflict would again revive the need for alternative fuels. The Organization of the Petroleum Exporting Countries (OPEC), made substantial cuts in exports to non-OPEC nations leading to severe increases in oil prices, which prompted Europe to renew its search for biofuels. These rising prices continued into the twentieth century. With the new century came increased environmental consciousness regarding the impact fossil fuels have on the environment. The increase in prices, and interest in sustainability lead to unprecedented innovation in the alternative fuel industry. Thus biofuels such as ethanol are now used all over the world as an alternative fuel in internal combustion engines. While complete substitution is not yet common throughout Europe, countries like Germany have been using E10 fuel (consisting of 10% ethanol) since 2011. E10 fuels have replaced the previous E5 fuel, containing 5% ethanol; although this may seem like a slight increase in ethanol use, this increase reflects a more progressive Europe as improvements are being made based primarily upon environmentally conscious efforts, rather than geopolitical or economic pressures.

Current legislation 
The EU has played a large role in increasing the use of biofuels in member states; however, it has also aimed, to some extent, to mitigate the potential negative impacts of biofuel production. Legislative procedures in Europe currently involve a proposal made by the European Commission, followed by a process of up to 3 readings and amendments through the European Parliament, its committees, and the Council of the European Union. This process results in discussion, and document revision that can then be voted in parliament. All member state of the European Union are bound by such legislation and required to follow it. Legislation encompassing the use of biofuels in Europe consists of several energy/climate policy documents including the Indirect Land Usage Change (ILUC) directive of 2015, The Renewable Energy Directive (RED) of 2009, and the Fuel Quality Directive (FQD) of 2009.

Current EU legislation as approved by the European Parliament in 2008 focuses on visions for 2020. Legislative targets involving the use of biofuels are covered to a large extent in the Renewable Energy Directive (RED), which aims to source 10% of energy in transport sectors from renewables by 2020. Further goals include a 20% increase in renewable energy consumption, a 20% increase in energy efficiency, no biofuel feedstock sourced from carbon-rich land, compliance with environment and social sustainability criteria of differing countries exporting fuels as well as reductions in GHG lifecycle emissions of transport fuels by 6%. Targets stated in the Indirect Land Usage Change directive (ILUC) complement the RED act, and relate to biofuel usage in the EU. These targets include accounting for GHG emissions caused from land use change as well as solely biofuel usage, limiting the share of biofuel crops that can be grown on agricultural land as well as a number of reporting/ethical obligations for fuel providers. The Fuel Quality Directive (FQD) was revised in 2011 to act in harmony with these two legislations, introducing laws on greenhouse gas intensities from fuels used in transport and machinery, and reducing them by 6% by 2020.

RED II proposals

On 16 January 2018, the European Parliament endorsed proposals for a legislative Renewable Energy Directive II, which aims to aid in reaching goals for the 2030 EU Climate and Energy Framework. Key targets involved in the legislation include:

 a 35% increase in energy efficiency.
 a minimum 35% share of renewable sources in total final energy consumption.
 14% of renewable energy used in transport.
 a phase-out of palm oil by 2030.

An end to the use of crop-based biofuels by 2030, and the use of biomass for electricity production, was also endorsed by the European Parliament committee by a smaller majority. Currently, the European Parliament committee and the Industry, Research and Energy committee have voted in agreement on this new RED II legislation; however, a full European Parliamentary vote is now needed.

The legislation highlighted in the chart below transposes the requirements of the RED, FQD, or both into the policies of each member country in order to comply with EU regulations. In some countries, double counting is allowed for biofuels made from select materials, such as waste, non-food cellulosic materials, and others. Materials that qualify for double counting differ between countries. Many EU countries have minimum renewable energy source (RES) targets and minimum overall biofuel targets. The countries that do not have any minimum targets are Estonia, Germany, Latvia, and Sweden.

*For select materials

Criticisms in legislation

There is a general awareness that the current EU policy has led to the increased use of conventional biofuels, coming from feedstock and food crops, which in effect compromises agricultural space. The current EU legislation has therefore been criticized for accentuating the negative side effects that follow an increase in first generation biofuel consumption while failing to successfully address these issues. In Tanzania for example, Dutch company BioShape compromised the land and deprived four communities of living space, in order to supply green energy to Dutch and Belgian markets. Operations at the far end of supply chains of, such European biofuel producers, have also been shown to engage in abusive practices of local communities. In Sumatra, Indonesia, a supply company of Wilmar International obtained concessions of large amounts of land originally put aside by the government for community use, and violently prevented community access to it, in attempts to maximize profits.

The adoption of non-land based feedstock or ''advanced biofuels'' derived from wastes and bacteria has proven to be a more sustainable solution than conventional biofuels.  However, proposals of the revised RED II target to phase out conventional biofuels has received many criticisms; "miraculously relying on a successful transition to advanced biofuels" has not been backed by science or logic, according to former Irish minister for the environment, Dick Roche. The infrastructure and technologies are not yet established to be able to perform such processes efficiently, and sudden removal of biofuels could lead to drastic pressure and overuse of other fuel sources. Criticisms from organisations such as Oxfam and WWF Europe also revolve around cutting the use of palm oil in biofuels and the side effects on these industries. Arguments include ruining livelihoods of those who rely on palm oil industries for survival in countries such as Indonesia and Malaysia, as well as allowing other powers like China to dominate and increase palm oil imports to compensate.

Recent legislation has also been criticised for hindering the ability of member states to reach the post-Paris sustainable development goals (SDGs). The 70,000 km2 of agricultural land used to produce biofuels in Europe in 2008 could have been used to feed 127 million people for a year, contributing to the 'end hunger and poverty' SDG. "Policies that subsidize or mandate food-based biofuel production or consumption drive up food prices and multiply price shocks in agricultural markets". Furthermore, on average, food-based crops emit more than 50% more greenhouse gasses than fossil fuels, resulting in an increase in transport emissions in 2020 rather than a decrease.

Debates regarding the use of biofuels 
The debate within the EU surrounding biofuels ‘"has long been seen as a battle between politicians intent on finding a viable alternative to fossil fuels and campaign groups that claim the creation of biofuels creates potential environmental damage, cuts into food production, and may be of limited effect in tackling climate change." The 2009 RED committed the EU to generating 20% of its energy mix from renewable sources, while capping the share of biofuels used in the transport sector at 7%. This Directive intended to compromise between the two sides of the argument surrounding the use of biofuels. "Analysts have said that biofuel seemed an ideal solution for the EU a couple years ago. But the longer-term impact on food prices, deforestation and environment prompted a rethink". The most prominent aspects of this ''rethink'' are the economic opportunity of biofuel usage and green energy, the potential effect on food prices and availability using biofuel may have, and the degree to which biofuel use could benefit the environment.

The EU has been debating whether it should increase its lowering emissions target to above 20% by 2020. There is a divide in the EU between "those who see climate-change policy as detrimental to growth and those seeing it as beneficial to growth". Many member states have also been internally divided by their ministries in this regard. Step-up negotiations have formed a pattern where EU states attempt to reach a decision by an external event, and this is quickly rejected by a coalition led by Poland, including Italy and some new member states. But member states cannot always be treated as unified actors, because in several instances, the positions of various ministries from the same government diverged. Debates in the EU about whether or not green technologies are economically beneficial affect the way in which biofuels are seen. The support for biofuels comes from the side of the EU which considers green technology to be economically beneficial. However, biofuels are more controversial than some other renewable technologies, like wind power or solar power.

There are potential economic benefits to the use of biofuels, as they are said to be the cheapest potential sources of fuel available in the world. Additionally, "the production of crop-based biofuels in Europe generates at least 6.6 billion euros in direct revenue for farmers per year". But, "'beside Europe's changing regulatory structure, farmers and ethanol producers are concerned by the potential for unfair competition from South America once the EU closes its trade deal with the continent's Mercosur trade bloc." Brazil is a prominent member of Mercosur, and is pushing for the EU to accept large quotas for ethanol imports. This would threaten the economic benefits that farmers in the EU would stand to gain from biofuel consumption. Martin Merrild, the outgoing president of the Association of European Farmers' Unions (COPA) believes "any such deal would expose EU farmers to unacceptable and unfair competition". "Free trade is very important for farmers", Merrild said, "but we cannot accept double standards. There will never be fair competition between the EU and Latin America as they do not produce under the same conditions or meet the same standards".

Biofuels are carbon neutral, renewable, recyclable, and a cleaner energy source than fossil fuels. Another advantage to biofuel use is sovereignty, which is especially relevant to the EU. The materials needed for producing biofuels are widely available all around the world so communities and countries can potentially rely on their own resources. This marks a change from fossil fuels which are only available in certain areas of the world, so nations relying on this energy are dependent upon foreign energy. Moving away from fossil fuels would mean the EU could be more self-reliant when it comes to energy sources, and emissions from transporting fuel could be reduced too.

Biofuels are also increasing greenhouse gas emissions through a phenomenon known as indirect land use change, as biofuels displace food production and farmers are forced to reclaim land from carbon-rich ecosystems such as forests and peatlands. Old growth trees act as carbon sinks, when farmers clear those forests this releases the carbon that was locked up in those large trees. But not all biofuels are equal in their impact. Second-generation biofuels do not displace food production or cause more greenhouse gas emissions. To address this issue, in November 2016, the EU revised its renewable energy directive, which now calls for a complete ban on first-generation biofuels. Fuels made from oils such as palm oil and soy oil are being especially targeted. The revised Renewable Energy Directive covers the period 2021 to 2030, and also "calls for a further increase in the share of renewable energy in the EU's mix to at least 27% by 2030". At the same time, it aims to cut the use of crop-based biofuels to 3.8% of transport fuel and shift the market towards' secondary biofuel sources. There are also debates around converting land from food to biofuels, which could drive up food prices and threaten food security. With current population growth and water shortages this could be very dangerous.

See also
List of renewable energy topics by country
Biofuels by region

References